Mark Mitchell (born April 6, 1961) is an American speed skater. He competed in three events at the 1984 Winter Olympics.

References

External links
 

1961 births
Living people
American male speed skaters
Olympic speed skaters of the United States
Speed skaters at the 1984 Winter Olympics
Sportspeople from Minneapolis